Rois-bheinn is the joint highest hill in the Scottish region of Moidart, a title it shares with its neighbour Beinn Odhar Bheag.

The mountain may be climbed by its west ridge from the small village of Roshven (a settlement that takes its name from a roughly phonetic spelling of Rois-bheinn's name), or from Inverailort to the north.

The Moidart peninsula is separated from the lands to its north by the deep pass of Loch Eilt, making Rois-bheinn one of the more prominent hills in the British Isles.

External links
 Rois-bheinn on MunroMagic.com

Marilyns of Scotland
Corbetts
Mountains and hills of Highland (council area)